Viva La Bam is an American reality television series that stars Bam Margera and his friends and family. The show is a spin-off from MTV's Jackass, in which Margera and most of the main cast appeared. Each episode had a specific theme, mission, or challenge which was accomplished by performing pranks, skateboarding, and enlisting the help of friends, relatives, and/or experts. Although partly improvised, the show was supported by a greater degree of planning and organization.

History

Production 
The cast included Bam Margera, Ryan Dunn, Brandon DiCamillo, Raab Himself, and Rake Yohn. The show also starred Bam's parents Phil and April and his uncle Don Vito. Tim Glomb and Brandon Novak later joined the main cast. The show was mostly filmed in and around West Chester, Pennsylvania and also visited Las Vegas, Atlantic City, New Orleans, Los Angeles, Minneapolis, Mexico, Brazil, and Finland. Bam and his friends also went to Miami in 2006 for "Viva La Spring Break", a two-part episode rarely seen since its original broadcast. The episode "Iceland", originally shot for the second season, became known as the "Lost Episode" of the series, and can be found on Viva La Bands: a two-disc compilation album featuring several bands from the series.

The show debuted on October 26, 2003, and concluded on August 14, 2005, on the MTV network in the United States. It later became licensed around the world. Tony Hawk starred in the pilot and 'Mardi Gras' episodes. Each of the five seasons consisted of eight half-hour episodes, comprising 40 episodes in total. In December 2005, Bam Margera addressed rumors of a sixth season on Last Call with Carson Daly. His comment was that there would be no sixth season, but there would be occasional MTV specials and he and Johnny Knoxville were planning things for possible Jackass stunts. On March 22, 2006, a 2 episode special of Viva La Bam, titled "Viva La Spring Break" aired. It featured Bam and his friends, his parents April and Phil, and his uncle Don Vito travelling from West Chester, Pennsylvania to Fort Lauderdale, Florida together to cause mayhem at a beach party, with them doing stunts and pulling pranks underway. Notably, Raab Himself did not appear in this special.

Featured music and guests 
The show also featured music from some of Margera's favorite bands, such as HIM, CKY, The Bloodhound Gang, Cradle of Filth, Clutch, Turbonegro, Dimmu Borgir, Carnal Forge, Slayer, Gwar, Children of Bodom, The Bled, The 69 Eyes, and Free Beer. Many of Margera's friends also appear on the show, including Johnny Knoxville, The Dudesons, and fellow skateboarders Tony Hawk, Terry Kennedy, Jason Ellis, and Bob Burnquist. Actor Sean Penn and his son Hopper made an appearance in the episode "Fort Knoxville", and rock musician Billy Idol appeared on the "special" birthday episode "Ape's Surprise". In the episode "Snake Run Driveway" there are a number of celebrities such as Tommy Lee, Dave Grohl, Holly Madison, Pharrell Williams, Don "Magic" Juan and Charlie O'Connell.

Episodes

See also 
 CKY
 CKY (band)
 CKY crew
 Jackass
 Viva La Bands
 Bam's Unholy Union
 Bam's World Domination
 Bam's Bad Ass Game Show
 Wildboyz

References 

 "Viva la Bam" Seasons 1-5 MTV / 18 Husky Productions, 2003–2005

External links 
 

CKY
MTV original programming
2000s American reality television series
2003 American television series debuts
2005 American television series endings
Television shows set in Pennsylvania
English-language television shows
American television spin-offs
Reality television spin-offs
Practical jokes
Jackass (TV series)